Hurley Common is a village in North Warwickshire, England, between Wood End and Hurley, it consists of several houses and 2 Farms, Hurley common does not have its own Parish Church so it is technically a hamlet. Population details for the 2011 Census can be found under Kingsbury.

History
Hurley Common dates from before the nearby village of Wood End which was built in 1890. The name suggests that it was originally the common land to the village of Hurley. During the early 20th century there were several mines in the area; all have now closed.

Demographics
According to the 2001 Census the population of the Hurley and Wood End ward was 3,642. Over 99.5% of people (3,550) describe themselves as White British with only 89 people from other ethnic groups. The Ward has an almost exact 50:50 split of males and females, with a ratio of 1,822 to 1,820 respectively. According to Kingsbury Parish Council there are "little more" than 50 people who live in the village.

Governance
The village is part of the Kingsbury civil parish. The village was originally part of the Tamworth Rural District from its creation until 1965, when it became part of the Atherstone Rural District. In 1974 under the Local Government Act 1972 it became part of the newly formed district of North Warwickshire. Inside North Warwickshire it is part of the Hurley and Wood End Ward, and because of the mining connection the ward often elects Labour councillors. It is part of the North Warwickshire constituency.

Education
There has never been a school in the village so most primary school students either attend Wood End Primary School or the Primary school in Hurley. High school aged children attend Kingsbury School.

Public services
Water and sewage services are provided by Severn Trent Water. Unlike Kingsbury Hurley Common uses a Coventry (CV) Postcode rather than a Birmingham (B) postcode; the Postal Town is Atherstone. The nearest Restaurant/Takeaway is in Hurley and  the nearest shops are in Wood End and Hurley. The nearest police and fire stations are in Atherstone.

Crime
In 2009 there was an average of 3.6 crimes per 1,000 people for the ward of Hurley and Wood End, and during the same period there were 5 crimes per head for the borough of North Warwickshire. In 2010 the figure was down to 3 crimes per head. The most common type of crime is anti-social behaviour.

Health
The village lies in the North Warwickshire NHS trust area. The village does not have its own doctor's surgery or pharmacy The nearest GPs surgeries can be found in and Hurley. The George Eliot Hospital at Nuneaton is the area's local hospital. It has an Accident and Emergency Department. Out of hours GP services are also based at George Eliot. There is also Good Hope Hospital in Sutton Coldfield.

Religion
According to the 2001 census the Ward of Hurley and Wood End is 80% Christian, 19% Non-Religious and 1% Other. There was previously a Wesleyan Methodist chapel in the village but has long since gone. The nearest churches are St Michael & All Angels Church in Wood End and Church of the Resurrection in Hurley

Recreation
The village has a public house called the Anchor Inn with a small play area, halfway between Hurley Common and Hurley.  There is also a riding school in the village called Holly Riding School.  The village does not have a village hall but there is one in Wood End and one in Hurley. The nearest leisure facilities are in Kingsbury, and the Snowdome in Tamworth.

Transport
Hurley Common lies close to the M42 at junction 10. The village has 3 bus stops along the road named Hurley Common served by routes 767, 777, 115, 118 and 119 and the nearest railway station is Wilnecote. The nearest airport is Birmingham (17 miles).

Media
The local newspapers covering the area are the Tamworth Herald and the Atherstone Recorder. Local radio includes BBC Coventry & Warwickshire, Free Coventry & Warwickshire and Capital Mid-Counties. The village is covered by the Central ITV and BBC West Midlands TV regions.

References

Villages in Warwickshire
Kingsbury, Warwickshire